Rural Township, Illinois may refer to the following townships:

Rural Township, Rock Island County, Illinois
Rural Township, Shelby County, Illinois

See also

Rural Township (disambiguation)

Illinois township disambiguation pages